The yellow-bellied elaenia (Elaenia flavogaster) is a small bird of the tyrant flycatcher family. It breeds from southern Mexico and the Yucatán Peninsula through Central and South America as far as northern Argentina, and on Trinidad and Tobago.

Description

They have olive-brown upperparts, a white eye ring, a bushy divided crest and a white crown patch in the parting. The throat is pale and the breast greyish, with pale yellow lower underparts. The call is a nasal breeer, and the song is a wheezing zhu-zhee-zhu-zhee.

Subspecies
Four subspecies are recognized:
 Elaenia flavogaster subpagana – Sclater, PL, 1860: found from southeastern Mexico to Costa Rica and on Coiba Island, Panama
 Elaenia flavogaster pallididorsalis – Aldrich, 1937: found in Panama
 Elaenia flavogaster flavogaster – (Thunberg, 1822): nominate, found in Colombia, Venezuela, Trinidad, and the southern Lesser Antilles, the Guianas, Brazil except western and central Amazonas, southeastern Peru, Bolivia, Paraguay and northeastern Argentina
 Elaenia flavogaster semipagana – Sclater, PL, 1862: found in southwestern Colombia, western and southern Ecuador and northwestern Peru

Habitat
This is a common bird in semi-open woodland, scrub, gardens and cultivation. The yellow-bellied elaenia is a noisy and conspicuous bird which feeds on berries and insects. The latter are usually caught from mid-air after the bird sallies from a perch, and sometimes picked up from plants. The species will also join mixed-species feeding flocks on occasion, typically staying quite some distance up in the trees.

It makes a cup nest and lays two cream eggs with reddish blotches at the larger end. The female incubates for 16 days, with about the same period to fledging. Omnivorous mammals as small as the common marmoset (Callithrix jacchus) will eagerly plunder yellow-bellied elaenia nests in the undergrowth—perhaps more often during the dry season when fruits are scarce—despite the birds' attempts to defend their offspring.

Conservation status
The yellow-bellied elaenia is a common and wide-ranging bird, not considered threatened by the IUCN.

References

Further reading

External links

 
 
 
 Yellow-bellied elaenia Stamps from Grenada, Saint Vincent and the Grenadines, Suriname at bird-stamps.org
 
 
 
 

yellow-bellied elaenia
Birds of Mexico
Birds of Central America
Birds of the Yucatán Peninsula
Birds of the Guianas
Birds of Trinidad and Tobago
Birds of Grenada
Birds of Saint Vincent and the Grenadines
Birds of Colombia
Birds of Venezuela
Birds of Ecuador
Birds of Bolivia
Birds of Brazil
Birds of Paraguay
yellow-bellied elaenia